= DANCOM =

Dancom Telecommunications Sdn Bhd
- Company type: Private Limited Company
- Industry: Telecommunication
- Founded: 1985
- Headquarters: Kuala Lumpur, Malaysia
- Products: Telco Prepaid Cards, Office Automation, Consumer Electronics, Telco Engineering, IT Solutions
- Website: www.dancom.com.my

The Dancom Group is a telecommunications company operating in Malaysia. It was established in 1985 as Dancom Telecommunications Sdn Bhd.
